The Kosovo men's national 3x3 team (/Muški 3x3 reprezentacija Kosova) represents Kosovo in international men's 3x3 basketball. It is controlled by the Basketball Federation of Kosovo, the governing body for basketball in Kosovo.

Competitive record

FIBA 3x3 Europe Cup
On 30 May 2019, The Basketball Federation of Kosovo confirmed that Kosovo will be part of 2019 FIBA 3x3 Europe Cup qualifications, together with Andorra and Slovenia. On 30 June 2019, Kosovo made his debut on 2019 FIBA 3x3 Europe Cup qualifications with a 21–8 away defeat against Slovenia and in the same day, Kosovo takes the first win in qualifications that was simultaneously also the first-ever competitive win was a 6–21 away win against Andorra.

Team

Current roster
The following is the Kosovo roster were called up for the 2019 FIBA 3x3 Europe Cup qualifications.

|}
|style="vertical-align:top;"|
Head coach
 Agon Fehmiu

(C) Team captain
Age – describes age,on 30 May 2019
|}<noinclude>

Notes and references

Notes

References

External links
 

Men's national 3x3 basketball teams
3x3